Dimaruguri is a census town in Nagaon district  in the state of Assam, India.

Demographics
 India census, Dimaruguri had a population of around 9219. Males constitute 52% of the population and females 48%. Dimaruguri has an average literacy rate of 66%, higher than the national average of 59.5%: male literacy is 71% and, female literacy is 61%. In Dimaruguri, 13% of the population is under 6 years of age.

References

Cities and towns in Nagaon district